Frank Duncan Riggs (born September 5, 1950) is an American army veteran, former law enforcement officer, charter school executive, and politician from the states of California and Arizona. He served three terms in the  U.S. House of Representatives during the 1990s.

Early life
Frank Riggs was born in Louisville, Kentucky. He served in the United States Army from 1972 to 1975.

Career
An Army veteran, having served as a Military Police officer, Riggs worked as a police officer and deputy sheriff in Santa Barbara, California, and Sonoma County, respectively.  He was a member of the Windsor Unified School District Board of Trustees from 1984 to 1988 and was a real estate executive and owner of his own development company for over 20 years.

In 1999, Riggs joined the board of the Charter Schools Development Corporation, and served with CSDC until 2012.  During his service, CSDC went from being a start-up nonprofit to a national leader in financing and developing educational facilities for charter schools, reaching $125 million in assets, and procuring and leveraging private capital for facility acquisitions and improvements worth $680 million; representing over four million square feet of facilities for 235 charter schools in 25 states.

In 2001, he moved to Arizona. He served as CEO of ABS School Services of Phoenix, which provides financial accounting and business management services to approximately 200 school district charter, private, and federal grant schools. Riggs was also the founding board president for Arizona Connections Academy, a statewide on-line charter school.  He has resided in Scottsdale, Arizona for 14 years.

California Congressman
Riggs was elected to the United States House of Representatives as a Republican in 1990 from California's 1st District, narrowly defeating four-term Democrat Doug Bosco.  He represented the area stretching from Napa County to the northern Pacific coast.  He served in the 102nd, 104th, and 105th Congresses.  During his service, he was on the House Appropriations Committee (including the Agriculture and the Energy and Water Development Subcommittees), the House Transportation and Public Works Committee, and the House Banking and Financial Affairs Committee.

Riggs also served on the House Education and Workforce Committee and chaired the Subcommittee on Early Childhood, Youth and Families in the 105th Congress.  In that capacity, he authored the Charter School Expansion Act (signed into law by President Bill Clinton in October, 1998) which provides federal start-up grants to newly formed charter schools to help defray their initial operating expenses.  Most Arizona charter schools have received federal start-up grants as a result of Riggs' legislation.

Riggs voted against the Gulf War resolution and, as a member of the Gang of Seven, a group of freshman Republican congressmen, favored identifying publicly the congressmen who made overdrafts at the House Bank. He was defeated in 1992 by Democrat Dan Hamburg but won a rematch in 1994.

In 1996, he won re-election over Democrat Michela Alioto-Pier.

California U.S. Senate campaign
 
In 1998, Riggs faced a potentially competitive contest against State Senator Mike Thompson, who was due to be termed out of his seat. Thompson's state senate district was virtually coextensive with the congressional district. Riggs decided not to run for re-election. Instead, he ran for the Republican nomination for the United States Senate. A late entrant, he dropped out of the race before Election Day but still finished in fifth place (the fourth place Republican) in the state's open primary system. The nomination was won by State Treasurer Matt Fong. Meanwhile, Thompson easily won the congressional race.

Arizona campaigns

In 2005, he explored a run for governor, as most Arizona Republicans were deciding not to challenge popular Governor Janet Napolitano for reelection the following year. However, he discovered that he had to be a five-year resident of Arizona in order to run for governor.

In 2014, he unsuccessfully sought the Republican nomination for Governor of Arizona, finishing last in the Republican primary with less than five percent of the vote.

In 2016, Riggs created an exploratory candidacy for the Arizona Corporation Commission, but ultimately did not run for the position.

Arizona Superintendent of Public Instruction campaign

In the 2018 Arizona Republican primary election, Riggs ran for state Superintendent of Public Instruction against college professor Dr. Bob Branch, incumbent Diane Douglas, former Basis Charter Schools Director of Charter School Development Jonathan Gelbart and former public school teacher Tracy Livingston. A week after the election in which Riggs traded the lead with Dr. Branch several times, Riggs came out ahead by only 249 votes. However, he lost the race to Democrat Kathy Hoffman in the November 6, 2018, general election.

References

External links

 

|-

1950 births
American deputy sheriffs
American military police officers
Arizona Republicans
Living people
Politicians from Scottsdale, Arizona
People from Sonoma County, California
Politicians from Louisville, Kentucky
Republican Party members of the United States House of Representatives from California
School board members in California
United States Army soldiers
Members of Congress who became lobbyists